The Belwind Wind Farm is located on Bligh Bank,  from the Belgian port of Zeebrugge, and has been built in two phases.  It has a 330 MW production capacity and an estimated annual output of 1.1 TWh. Phase 1 had a 165 MW production capacity.

Financing
Bligh Bank is the first stage of what is planned to be a 330 MW project. It was financed under a Project Finance structure by Project Company ‘Belwind’, after a number of delays that included bankruptcy of developer Econcern. Financial close was eventually reached on July 27, 2009. Bligh Bank is only the third offshore wind farm to be Project Financed, following Q7 and Thornton Bank.  The €614 million deal sees Colruyt Group, the Colruyt family, SHV, ParticipatieMaatschappij Vlaanderen, Meewind and Rabo Project Equity, come together to invest in the construction of the 165 MW first stage of the Project. For the first time the European Investment Bank will assume project finance risk for an offshore wind farm, by granting €300 million towards financing the Project.

In January 2011 SHV sold its 20,7 % equity-share to the other Belgian shareholders Colruyt Group, the Colruyt family and ParticipatieMaatschappij Vlaanderen. The financial close of the Second Phase of the project was on 6 October 2015.

First phase
Construction of the first phase commenced in August 2009 and was completed on 9 December 2010. 
The wind farm includes an Offshore High Voltage Station which converts the infield 33kV to the export cable (150kV). This export cable is connected to the second high-voltage station, (the Booster Transformer Station) in Zeebrugge. In 2012 Alstom planned to install a wind turbine of 6 MW Haliade as a test, which happened in November 2013.

Second phase
The construction of the second phase was mostly in 2016, with the first foundation on 12 May, first turbine on 27 of October and first electricity production 9 January 2017. The park has been fully commissioned as of 24 May 2017.

Revenue
The Belwind Wind Farm has a green certificate, meaning it will receive a set minimum price through Elia, €107 per MWh for the first 216 MW, the remaining 114 MW will receive €90 per MWh. 
In 2011 it received €49,51 per MWh through the sale of the generated electricity to Electrabel.

See also

Thorntonbank Wind Farm (Belgium)
Wind power in Belgium
List of offshore wind farms
List of offshore wind farms in the North Sea
Lists of offshore wind farms by country

References

External links 
 
 LORC - Belwind Datasheet

Offshore wind farms in the North Sea
Wind farms in Belgium
Energy infrastructure completed in 2010
2010 establishments in Belgium